EUCLID, also called Pôle Universitaire Euclide or Euclid University, is an international intergovernmental organization with a university charter established in 2008. It has official headquarters in The Gambia and in the Central African Republic, but also maintains an executive office in Washington, D.C. Its primary mandate is to train officials for its Participating States but its programs are also offered to the general public. The institution's current Secretary-General is Winston Dookeran.

History 
EUCLID's origins are connected with the creation of a group of universities called "Euclid Consortium" by the University of Bangui and the University of N'Djamena in 2006. The project was administered by the International Organization for Sustainable Development, an international non-governmental organization headed by Syed Zahid Ali.
First conceived as an international extension for the University of Bangui, "Euclid" was redefined and constituted and a distinct institution in 2008 by an intergovernmental convention. The same year, the rector of the University of Bangui, Faustin-Archange Touadera was appointed as Prime Minister, and signed the convention formalizing his country's participation in EUCLID in 2010.
In January 2008, Syed Zahid Ali, acting as Secretary-General of IOSD, presented to various government representative attending a conference of the Islamic Chamber of Commerce and Industry a new legal framework called EUCLID Phase 2. Soon after, several governments interested in using the Euclid programs to train their own staff approved the statutes of the new international university which entered into force in April 2008.

Treaty information and legal status

United Nations treaty publication 
According to the United Nations Treaty Series records, the EUCLID Open Memorandum of Understanding is classified as a "multilateral treaty" and entered into force in April 2008, The "Updated Framework Agreement" entered into force in September 2009.
The agreements signed by the Gambia have been registered by the Permanent Mission of the Gambia to the United Nations in 2013 but are not yet published.

Participating states

Headquarters 

The initial 2008 agreement indicated that "The operational offices of EUCLID are allowed to remain in Brussels, Belgium and may be relocated or extended elsewhere upon recommendation of the Governing Board or by resolution of the Oversight Council" (Statutes II.3).
In 2011, EUCLID signed a first headquarters agreement with the Central African Republic and obtained office space in the Prime Minister's building and on the campus of the University of Bangui. In 2013, owing to instability affecting Bangui and the Central African Republic, EUCLID signed a new headquarters agreement with the Republic of The Gambia, and leases offices in the Brusubi area of Banjul. Following the return of stability in the Central African Republic and the election of EUCLID's founding father and high steward Faustin-Archange Touadéra as president of the country in 2016, EUCLID signed an office sharing agreement with the National School of Administration and Magistracy (ENAM). As of 2017, EUCLID maintains both headquarters locations and is registered in the UNESCO IAU World Higher Education Database under Central African Republic rather than Gambia.

Treaty-related domain and intellectual property rights

According to its constitutive text, EUCLID is defined as an having international legal personality and was granted a .int domain name under IANA regulations. As an "international intergovernmental organization", the institution also enjoys intellectual property protection under Article 6ter of the Paris Convention for the Protection of Industrial Property which is administered by the World Intellectual Property Organization.

Schools and Academic programs
EUCLID is organized in six academic units or schools:

School of Diplomacy and International Affairs

 H. Tristram Engelhardt School of Global Health and Bioethics
 School of Theology and Interfaith Studies
 School of Global Economics and Development
 School of Education, Language and Interpretation

EUCLID offers graduate programs in:
 International Law and Treaty Law
 Mediation and Conflict Resolution
 Sustainable Development
 Islamic Banking and Finance
 Interreligious Dialogue
 Climate and Energy Studies
 International Public Health
 Bioethics
International Organizations
Energy Studies
Comparative Christian Theology
Diplomacy and International Affairs
Eastern and Greek Orthodox Theology
Global Economics and Development
Interfaith Dialogue and Diplomacy
Renewable Energy Studies
Instructional Design and Open Learning
Catholic Studies
Sustainable Development and Diplomacy
Terrorism Studies and De-Radicalization

Joint degree programs 
EUCLID signed in 2015 a joint degree program agreement with CAFRAD, an intergovernmental organization dedicated to public administration in Africa, serving 36 Member States. A similar joint degree program agreement was signed the COMESA Leather Product Institute. These agreements regulate the following programs:
 MBA in Islamic Finance
 MBA in Leather Commerce and Industry
 Master's in International Public Administration

Special programs 
EUCLID was also involved in delivering distance-learning programs to civil servants in cooperation with the Ministry of Education of Eritrea between 2008 and 2012.

Organizational structure
EUCLID's structure is spelled out in the statutes considered as an annex to the published treaties. Its administrative organs are:
 A Governing Board
 A Board of Advisors
 An Executive Board
 An Oversight Council.

Secretaries-general and High Stewards
 Winston Dookeran (Secretary-General, 2020–present)
 Syed Zahid Ali (Secretary-General, 2008–2020)
 Juan Avila, (Ambassador, Permanent Mission of the Dominican Republic to the United Nations), High Steward since 2015
 Faustin-Archange Touadéra (President of the Central African Republic), High Steward since 2014

Former High Stewards 
 Banny deBrum, (High Steward, 2009–2011) Ambassador of the Republic of the Marshall Islands to the United States (2008-2011)
 Mohamed Toihiri, (High Steward, 2011–2012) Ambassador of the Union of the Comoros to the United States (2011-current)
 Hermenegilde Niyonzima, (Institutional High Steward, 2012–present) Ambassador of the Republic of Burundi to the United Nations (2012-2014)
 Roubani Kaambi, (Diplomatic High Steward, 2012–2014) Ambassador of the Union of the Comoros to the United States and United Nations (2012-current)

Affiliated institutes
The EUCLID statutes mentions several "affiliated institutes":  
 International Organization for Sustainable Development (IOSD)
 EUROSTATE University Institute
 International Institute for Inter-Religious Dialogue and Diplomacy
 Center for Ecological Desertification and Reforestation.

Cooperation with other intergovernmental bodies
EUCLID has signed agreements with or is a member of:
 Islamic Chamber of Commerce, Industry and Agriculture (ICCIA), an affiliated institution of the Organisation of Islamic Cooperation
 Economic Community of West African States
 African Training and Research Centre in Administration for Development (CAFRAD)
 Islamic Development Bank (IsDB)
 Africa Leather and Leather Products Institute (ALLPI)
 International Anti-Corruption Academy (IACA)

Institutional memberships
 Academic Council on the United Nations Systems
 Association of African Universities
 Association of Universities of Asia and the Pacific (AUAP)
 International Anti-Corruption Academy (IACA)
 United Nations Academic Impact
 GUNI (Global University Network for Innovation)
 United Nations Global Compact
 PRME – United Nations Principles for Responsible Management Education
 GRLI – Globally Responsible Leadership Initiative

In his personal capacity, the EUCLID secretary general is a member of the International Association of University Presidents.

UN Interfaith Harmony Week prize
In 2016, EUCLID coordinated a series of events for the United Nations World Interfaith Harmony Week and was awarded first prize by the jury, with a gold medal to be presented to the EUCLID delegation in April 2016 by King Abdullah II of Jordan.

Accreditation and recognition

Central African Republic as Headquarters State
The Permanent Delegation to UNESCO posted in 2016 its filing which includes EUCLID as "recognized / accredited". EUCLID is accredited by the Ministry of Higher Education of Central African Republic as Headquarters State.

Gambia as Headquarters State
The National UNESCO Commission of Gambia posted in 2014 its "UNESCO Portal to Recognized Higher Education Institutions" documents which now include EUCLID (Euclid University) as "recognized / accredited". EUCLID holds institutional accreditation from the country's National Accreditation and Quality Assurance Authority (NAQAA).

UN statement 
The Permanent Mission of the Central African Republic to the United Nations wrote to the UN Secretariat in October 2012 to complain that the world's 5 international universities were not included in the UN Inspira database. In December 2012, the United Nations replied that "both IAU/UNESCO and the UN Secretariat recognize Euclide- Pole Universitaire Euclide and the other four UN institutions ... as being accredited" in spite of not being included in Inspira. The UN also indicated that these institutions which are "regional or global in nature" would be included under their headquarters states in future editions of the IAU WHED database used by the United Nations. The transfer was completed in September 2017.

Other participating states and Africa 
The 2008 intergovernmental agreement states in its Article I that "EUCLID is chartered to confer diplomas, degrees and completion certificates accredited by the ministries of Education of the Participating Parties."
Gambia and Timor-Leste indicate that the degrees issued by EUCLID upon completion of the required coursework will be legally valid for use in the country by the graduates.
According to the Permanent Mission of the Central African Republic to the United Nations, the UNESCO Regional Convention on the Recognition of Studies, Certificates, Diplomas, Degrees and other Academic Qualifications in Higher Education in the African States applies to EUCLID with effect in the 22 ratifying States.
EUCLID is since June 2012 a member of the Association of African Universities which requires its members to be accredited.

United States 
EUCLID is not a US-based university and it not accredited by an organization recognized by the U.S. Department of Education or Council on Higher Education Accreditation, but maintains an address in Washington, DC "exclusively used for appointments and meetings either with or by government-sponsored and government affiliated staff".
The letters sent in 2012 by the governments of Burundi, Central African Republic and Comoros to the US Department of State describe the institution as being "duly chartered to confer degrees by its Participating States and enjoys full academic accreditation according to its constitutive mandate under international law (Article I)."
Between 2008 and 2010, the state of Maine formerly listed "Euclid University" as an unaccredited institution. Maine removed the school from its list after receiving correspondence from EUCLID.
Michigan published until 2012 a list of non-CHEA recognized universities whose graduates could not use their degree for public service employment, a list that included both "Euclid University" and the "United Nations University". Following an exchange of letters with EUCLID, Michigan ceased maintaining a list of institutions lacking CHEA recognition, but advises that EUCLID graduates and all graduates from non-CHEA recognized universities applying for jobs with the State of Michigan must demonstrate that their degrees are equivalent to studies at a similar school accredited by a CHEA-recognized accrediting body.
In December 2013, following a correspondence with EUCLID's legal counsel and two ambassadors to the United States, Oregon's Attorney General's office wrote that the Oregon Office of Degree Authorization (ODA) had stopped maintaining and publishing its list of unrecognized universities. Regarding "Euclid University", the ODA had since 2008 posted the notice: "ODA is currently evaluating the present legal status of this entity." The Texas Higher Education Coordinating Board removed "Euclid University" from its list of "list of Institutions Whose Degrees are Illegal to Use in Texas" in October 2018.

References

External links
 
 

Intergovernmental organizations established by treaty
International organizations based in Africa
Organisations based in the Gambia
Organisations based in the Central African Republic
Educational institutions established in 2008
International universities
Intergovernmental universities
Schools of international relations
Universities in the Central African Republic